Alexander Edgar Douglas,  (12 April 1916, in Melfort, Saskatchewan – 26 July 1981, in Ottawa) was a Canadian physicist, known for his work in molecular spectroscopy. He was president of the Canadian Association of Physicists in 1975–1976.

Biography
Born on a farm in Saskatchewan, Douglas received his BA and MA degrees from the University of Saskatchewan. Gerhard Herzberg was his MA thesis advisor. During World War II, Douglas interrupted his studies to do military-related research in the Physics Division at the NRC. After the war, he earned his PhD in physics at Pennsylvania State University under David H. Rank. In 1949 Douglas became NRC's head of the Spectroscopy Section of the Physics Division, which was directed by Gerhard Herzberg. From 1969 to 1973 Douglas was the director of the Physics Division of the NRC. He returned to his previous job as head of the Spectroscopy Section in 1973 and remained in that position until his retirement from the NRC in 1980.

A. E. Douglas was the first to observe the spectra of B2, Si2, CH+, SiH+, NF,
PF, BN, CN+ and many other diatomic or triatomic molecules. He first identified the 4050 group of lines observed in comets as being due to the C3 molecule. Using a method that he developed, Douglas made the first studies of the Zeeman effect in polyatomic molecules.

According to Gerhard Herzberg:One of Douglas' most important contributions was his recognition of the reason for "anomalous lifetimes," that is, the failure of a simple relationship between absorption coefficient and lifetime to account for lifetimes in such compounds as NO2, SO2, C6H6. This phenomenon, referred to in the most recent literature as the Douglas effect, is closely connected with internal conversion in larger molecules.

In astrophysical applications of molecular spectroscopy, Douglas is known for his identification of interstellar CH+ and of cometary C3 and for the reproduction in the laboratory of the Meinel bands of N2+ and other spectra.

Honours and awards
 1956 – Elected Fellow of the Royal Society of Canada
 1970 – Medal for Achievement in Physics from the Canadian Association of Physicists
 1979 – Elected Fellow of the Royal Society of London
 1980 – International meeting on molecular spectroscopy sponsored in June in honour of A. E. Douglas by the NRC
 1981 – Henry Marshall Tory Medal

References

1916 births
1981 deaths
Canadian physicists
University of Saskatchewan alumni
Eberly College of Science alumni
Fellows of the Royal Society
Fellows of the Royal Society of Canada
People from Melfort, Saskatchewan
Spectroscopists
Presidents of the Canadian Association of Physicists